Peach Glen is an unincorporated community in Adams County, Pennsylvania, United States. The small community is located in uppermost Tyrone Township, on the border between Adams and Cumberland counties.

References

Unincorporated communities in Adams County, Pennsylvania
Unincorporated communities in Pennsylvania